

D03A Cicatrizants

D03AA Cod-liver oil ointments

D03AX Other cicatrizants
D03AX01 Cadexomer iodine
D03AX02 Dextranomer
D03AX03 Dexpanthenol
D03AX04 Calcium pantothenate
D03AX05 Hyaluronic acid
D03AX06 Becaplermin
D03AX09 Crilanomer
D03AX10 Enoxolone
D03AX11 Sodium chlorite (tetrachlorodecaoxide)
D03AX12 Trolamine
D03AX13 Betulae cortex
D03AX14 Centella asiatica herba
D03AX15 Trafermin
QD03AX90 Ketanserin

D03B Enzymes

D03BA Proteolytic enzymes
D03BA01 Trypsin
D03BA02 Clostridiopeptidase
D03BA03 Bromelains
D03BA52 Collagenase, combinations

References

D03